Ostaj Ovde is the sixteenth studio album of Mile Kitić.

Track listing

Ostaj Ovde
Na Kraju Sama 
Odlazi 
Daj Da Umrem Pevajuci 
Gori Nebo 
Spreman I Da Glavom Platim 
Nije Život Śto Smo Hteli 
Gde Si Bila Kad Sam Umirao 
Ljudi Su Vuci, Devojke Zmije 
Prsten Tuge

1997 albums
Mile Kitić albums